The name 2017 German Darts Masters was used for two darts tournaments organised by the Professional Darts Corporation in 2017:

 The 2017 German Darts Masters (European Tour), an event held in Jena in April 2017 as part of the 2017 European Tour
 The 2017 German Darts Masters (World Series of Darts), an event held in Düsseldorf in October 2017 as part of the 2017 World Series of Darts